Blue Valentine may refer to:

 Blue Valentine, poem by American poet Joyce Kilmer
 Blue Valentine (album), 1978 album by Tom Waits 
 Blue Valentine (film), a 2010 film starring Ryan Gosling and Michelle Williams
 "Blue Valentine", a 2021 song by Telenova
 Blue Valentine: an Erotic Romance, 2002 novel by Alison Tyler

See also
 Valentine (disambiguation)